Nicolas Duvauchelle (born 27 March 1980) is a French actor, perhaps best known for his role as Theo in three seasons of the crime drama Braquo.

Career

Duvauchelle starred in numerous films including Lightweight, À tout de suite and Le Grand Meaulnes. He has worked with Béatrice Dalle on films such as Trouble Every Day and Inside.

Personal life
Duvauchelle has three children: daughters Bonnie (with ex-partner Ludivine Sagnier) and Romy (with Laura Isaaz, a journalist and sister of actress Alice Isaaz), and son Andrea (with model Anouchka Alsif).

Filmography

Theater

Notes

External links

 

1980 births
Living people
20th-century French male actors
21st-century French male actors
French male film actors
French male television actors
Male actors from Paris